Bellville Township is a township in Pocahontas County, Iowa, USA.

History
Bellville Township is named for William Bell, a pioneer settler.

References

Townships in Pocahontas County, Iowa
Townships in Iowa